Mycena fera is a species of agaric fungus in the family Mycenaceae.  Found in South America, the fruit bodies of the fungus are bioluminescent.

See also 
List of bioluminescent fungi

References

External links 

fera
Bioluminescent fungi
Fungi described in 1997
Fungi of South America
Taxa named by Rudolf Arnold Maas Geesteranus